The New York City Charter is the municipal charter of New York City. As of January 2018, it includes a non-numbered introductory chapter, plus chapters identified by a number (1 through 75) or a number plus a letter suffix.

As part of the 1898 consolidation of New York City, the New York State Legislature enacted a charter for the consolidated city (Laws of 1897, chapter 378, effective January 1, 1898). The Charter was overhauled in 1989, after the New York City Board of Estimate had been declared unconstitutional, to redistribute power from the Board of Estimate to the Mayor and City Council.

Charter revisions 
The charter is periodically revised, generally via a charter commission including revisions that took place in 1898, 1901, 1938, 1963, 1975, and 2020.

The 1938 revision replaced the New York City Board of Aldermen with the New York City Council, and it also created the New York City Planning Commission.

The 1963 revision of the New York City Charter extended the Borough of Manhattan's "Community Planning Councils" (est. 1951) to the outer boroughs as "Community Planning Boards", which are now known as "Community Boards". This revision also increased the size of the New York City Council from 25 members to 35.

The 1975 revision of the New York City Charter set the number of Community Districts/Boards to 59, established the position of the district manager for the community districts, and created the Uniform Land Use Review Procedure (ULURP) which gave the community boards the authority to review land use proposals such as zoning actions, and special permits.

The 2020 revision included 19 ballot proposals, combined into 5 questions, all of which were approved in the general election on November 5, 2019. These revisions included the implementation of ranked choice voting beginning in 2021 for New York City municipal elections, the expansion of the powers and size of the New York City Civilian Complaint Review Board, an update to ethics rules for former city officials and members of the New York City Conflicts of Interest Board, changes to the city's annual budget process, and an extension in the time allocated to Community Boards and Borough Presidents to review proposed land use changes as part of the Uniform Land Use Review Procedure (ULURP).

See also
 New York City Administrative Code
 New York City Rules
 Board of Estimate of City of New York v. Morris

References

External links
 The current 2006 revised New York City Charter
 1963 revised New York City Charter
 Full text of the 1963 revised New York City Charter

 
New York (state) law
Charter
1898 in New York City